The 1929 World Snooker Championship, known at the time as the Professional Championship of Snooker, was a snooker tournament held between 17 December 1928 and 7 March 1929 at various venues in England, with the final taking place from 4 to 7 March 1929 at the Lounge Hall, Nottingham. Defending champion Joe Davis won the title for the third time by defeating Tom Dennis by 19  to 14 in the final, after securing a winning margin at 17–12.

It was the third edition of the World Snooker Championship. The first round match was held at Loughborough Town Hall, and the venue for the semi-finals was Camkin's Hall, Birmingham. The highest  of the tournament was 61, a new championship record, compiled by Davis in the 23rd frame of the final.

Background
Professional English billiards player and billiard hall manager Joe Davis had noticed the increasing popularity of snooker compared to billiards in the 1920s, and with Birmingham-based billiard hall manager Bill Camkin, who had also seen snooker's increasing appeal, persuaded the Billiards Association and Control Council (BACC) to recognise an official professional snooker championship in the 1926–27 season. The inaugural event was won by Davis, who defeated Tom Dennis 20–11 in the final. Originally called the Professional Championship of Snooker, the annual competition was not titled the World Championship until 1935, but the 1927 tournament is now referred to as the first World Snooker Championship.

For the 1928 championship, a qualifying competition had been held to produce a challenger to Davis, the defending champion. In July 1928 the BACC decided to abandon the challenge system that had been employed for both the Billiards Championship and the Professional Snooker Championship. This meant that Davis, the champion, had to play through the 1929 tournament, which was the third staging of the championship.

The closing date for entries for the snooker championship was 15 October 1928. The entry fee was set at five guineas per player, with a five-guineas sidestake required for each match. Preliminary heats and the semi-finals were to be best of 25 , played over three days, with the final contested over 33 frames across four days. When the conditions for the championship were published, Camkin's Hall in Birmingham was named as the venue for the final. For pre-final matches, the players concerned were to arrange the dates and venues.

Summary
Five players entered the Championship: Joe Davis (Chesterfield), Tom Dennis (Nottingham), Fred Lawrence (Birmingham), Alec Mann (Birmingham) and Kelsall Prince (Loughborough). Lawrence and Mann had to play a first round match, with the winner to meet Davis. Dennis and Prince faced each other in the other semi-final.

The first match played was the semi-final between Dennis and Prince. This was scheduled from 17 to 22 December 1928 at Town Hall, Loughborough, over six evening  rather than across the three sets of afternoon and evening sessions envisaged when the tournament's conditions were announced. There was just one of four frames each evening, with five planned for the final day. The match was close until halfway through the fourth session with Dennis then leading 8–6. However, Dennis then took the next five frames to win the match 13–6. He added the final frame of the evening to leave the score at 14–6 after five sessions. The match did not continue to the planned sixth session and so finished on 21 December.

The first round match and the other semi-final were arranged for the week of 21 to 26 January 1929 at Camkin's Hall, Birmingham. The first round match was on the first three days; the winner to play Davis on the last three days. Both matches were over 25 frames with two sessions of four frames each day. After 13 frames of their match, Lawrence led Mann 10–3 but Mann won the last three frames of the day to close the gap to 10–6. On the final day, Mann continued his run of frames, winning 9 out of 10, to take a 12–11 lead. However, Lawrence won the last two frames to take the match 13–12. The same writer also added that "the scarcity of the London Press reports in connexion with the Professional Snooker Games ... was freely commented upon in Birmingham."

In the Birmingham semi-final, Davis obtained a 5–3 lead on the first day, maintaining a two-frame advantage at 9–7 after two days. On the final day Davis won the first two frames but Lawrence took the next two to again close the gap. On the final evening, Davis won the first frame to lead 12–9 but lost the following frame. Davis added the third frame of the evening to secure a 13–10 victory.

Final
At the request of Davis and Dennis, the BACC agreed to change the venue and date of the final from Camkin's Hall in late March. The 33- final was played from 4 to 7 March. Eight frames were played each day, with four frames in the afternoon and four in the evening (five on the final day). The match was held at The Lounge, Shakespeare Street, Nottingham and was refereed by W. Malkinson of Nottingham. Davis led 6–2 after the first day. On the third day, the first frame featured prolonged exchanges of safety play, before a 45 break by Davis. Dennis won the 15th frame by six points, after clearing the last three colours. With the frames from the session shared, Davis retained his four frame lead at 10–6.

On day three, Dennis took three of the four frames in the afternoon, but Davis won three in the evening to maintain his four frame advantage. Davis compiled a 61 break in that evening session, potting nine , six  and two blues in the 23rd frame. In the fourth afternoon session, on 7 March, Davis lost the first frame by one point, 56–57, despite making a break of 45. With each player winning a further frame, the session finished with Davis 16–12 ahead. Davis then won the first frame in the evening, with breaks of 33, 24 and 33, to claim the championship by achieving a winning margin at 17–12. The four "dead" frames were played, with each player winning two. The Championship Cup was afterwards presented by Tinsley Lindley. Davis's break of 61 was a new championship record, and the only break of over 50 made during the tournament. The secretary of the BACC, A. Stanley Thorn, claimed that "the event attracted considerable interest in Nottingham, and excellent attendances were present during the four days' play."

Main draw

Schedule

Results
Match results are shown below. Winning players and scores are denoted in bold text, with scores including "dead" frames.

Final

References

1929
World Snooker Championship
World Snooker Championship
World Snooker Championship